Athelstane is an unincorporated community located in the town of Athelstane, Marinette County, Wisconsin, United States. Athelstane has a post office with ZIP code 54104. There are a number of lakes in the surrounding area including Lost Lake.

Images

References

External links

Unincorporated communities in Marinette County, Wisconsin
Unincorporated communities in Wisconsin